The Last of Us is a 2013 video game.

The Last of Us may also refer to:

 The Last of Us (franchise), a media franchise based on the video game series
 The Last of Us (TV series), a 2023 television series based on the video game series
 The Last of Us (film), a 2016 Tunisian drama film